Smoothstep is a family of sigmoid-like interpolation and clamping functions commonly used in computer graphics, video game engines, and machine learning.

The function depends on three parameters, the input x, the "left edge" and the "right edge", with the left edge being assumed smaller than the right edge. The function receives a real number x as an argument and returns 0 if x is less than or equal to the left edge, 1 if x is greater than or equal to the right edge, and smoothly interpolates, using a Hermite polynomial,  between 0 and 1 otherwise.  The gradient of the smoothstep function is zero at both edges.  This is convenient for creating a sequence of transitions using smoothstep to interpolate each segment as an alternative to using more sophisticated or expensive interpolation techniques.

Assuming that the left edge is 0, the right edge is 1, with the transition between edges taking place where 0 ≤ x ≤ 1.

A C/C++ example implementation provided by AMD follows.

float smoothstep (float edge0, float edge1, float x)
{
   if (x < edge0)
      return 0;

   if (x >= edge1)
      return 1;

   // Scale/bias into [0..1] range
   x = (x - edge0) / (edge1 - edge0);

   return x * x * (3 - 2 * x);
}The general form for smoothstep, again assuming the left edge is 0 and right edge is 1, is

 is identical to the clamping function:

The characteristic "S"-shaped sigmoid curve is obtained with  only for integers n ≥ 1.  The order of the polynomial in the general smoothstep is 2n + 1.  With n = 1, the slopes or first derivatives of the smoothstep are equal to zero at the left and right edge (x = 0 and x = 1), where the curve is appended to the constant or saturated levels.  With higher integer n, the second and higher derivatives are zero at the edges, making the polynomial functions as flat as possible and the splice to the limit values of 0 or 1 more seamless.

Variations 
Ken Perlin suggested an improved version of the commonly used first-order smoothstep function, equivalent to the second order of its general form. It has zero 1st- and 2nd-order derivatives at x = 0 and x = 1:

C/C++ reference implementation:
float smootherstep(float edge0, float edge1, float x) {
  // Scale, and clamp x to 0..1 range
  x = clamp((x - edge0) / (edge1 - edge0), 0.0, 1.0);
  // Evaluate polynomial
  return x * x * x * (x * (x * 6 - 15) + 10);
}

float clamp(float x, float lowerlimit, float upperlimit) {
  if (x < lowerlimit)
    x = lowerlimit;
  if (x > upperlimit)
    x = upperlimit;
  return x;
}

Origin

3rd-order equation 

Starting with a generic third-order polynomial function and its first derivative:

Applying the desired values for the function at both endpoints:

Applying the desired values for the first derivative of the function at both endpoints:

Solving the system of 4 unknowns formed by the last 4 equations result in the values of the polynomial coefficients:

This results in the third-order "smoothstep" function:

5th-order equation 

Starting with a generic fifth-order polynomial function, its first derivative and its second derivative:

Applying the desired values for the function at both endpoints:

Applying the desired values for the first derivative of the function at both endpoints:

Applying the desired values for the second derivative of the function at both endpoints:

Solving the system of 6 unknowns formed by the last 6 equations result in the values of the polynomial coefficients:

This results in the fifth-order "smootherstep" function:

7th-order equation 
Applying similar techniques, the 7th-order equation is found to be:

Generalization to higher-order equations 
Smoothstep polynomials are generalized, with 0 ≤ x ≤ 1 as

where N determines the order of the resulting polynomial function, which is 2N + 1. The first seven smoothstep polynomials, with 0 ≤ x ≤ 1, are

It can be shown that the smoothstep polynomials  that transition from 0 to 1 when x transitions from 0 to 1 can be simply mapped to odd-symmetry polynomials

where

and

The argument of RN(x) is −1 ≤ x ≤ 1 and is appended to the constant −1 on the left and +1 at the right.

// Generalized smoothstep
function generalSmoothStep(N, x) {
  x = clamp(x, 0, 1); // x must be equal to or between 0 and 1
  var result = 0;
  for (var n = 0; n <= N; ++n)
    result += pascalTriangle(-N - 1, n) *
              pascalTriangle(2 * N + 1, N - n) *
              Math.pow(x, N + n + 1);
  return result;
}

// Returns binomial coefficient without explicit use of factorials,
// which can't be used with negative integers
function pascalTriangle(a, b) {
  var result = 1; 
  for (var i = 0; i < b; ++i)
    result *= (a - i) / (i + 1);
  return result;
}

function clamp(x, lowerlimit, upperlimit) {
  if (x < lowerlimit)
    x = lowerlimit;
  if (x > upperlimit)
    x = upperlimit;
  return x;
}

Inverse Smoothstep 

The inverse of smoothstep() can be useful when doing certain operations in computer graphics when its effect needs to be reversed or compensated for. In the case of the 3rd-order equation there exists an analytical solution for the inverse, which is:

The series expansion of the inverse, on the other hand, does not terminate.

In GLSL:
float inverse_smoothstep(float x) {
  return 0.5 - sin(asin(1.0 - 2.0 * x) / 3.0);
}

References

External links 
 Using smoothstep (in the RenderMan Shading Language) by Prof. Malcolm Kesson.
 Interpolation tricks by Jari Komppa
 Swift Interpolation Playground demonstrates smoothStep(), smootherStep() and smoothestStep() in a Swift playground by Simon Gladman
 Inverse smoothstep by Inigo Quilez

Computer graphics algorithms